Robert or Bob Cobb may refer to:

 Robert W. Cobb, US government official
 Robert Cobb (American football), former American football defensive end
 Robert H. Cobb, American restaurateur, founder of the Brown Derby and purported creator of the Cobb salad

Fictional characters
 Bob Cobb, the secret identity of Mon-El of the Legion of Superheroes when he lives in Smallville.
 Bob Cobb (Seinfeld) or "the Maestro", a minor character from the American TV sitcom Seinfeld